Alexei Zuáznabar Grandales (born 10 March 1985) is a Cuban international footballer.

Club career
Playing for his provincial side Guantánamo, he was the league's top goalscorer in 2007.

International career
He made his debut for Cuba during the 2012 Caribbean Cup on 14 November 2012 in a 5-0 win over Suriname and has, as of January 2018, earned a total of 10 caps, scoring no goals. He was called up but did not feature in any FIFA World Cup qualification match. He was also named in the title winning final round squad that qualified for the 2013 CONCACAF Gold Cup.

References

External links
 

1985 births
Living people
Cuban footballers
Cuba international footballers
Association football forwards
FC Guantánamo players
2013 CONCACAF Gold Cup players
Sportspeople from Guantánamo